Dennis Boyd  (born November 5, 1955 in Washington, D.C.) is a retired American football player who played for the Seattle Seahawks of the National Football League from 1977 to 1982.  He was drafted out of Oregon State University in the 3rd round (58th overall) of the 1977 NFL Draft.  He played for the Seahawks in 59 games spanning 5 seasons.

References

1955 births
Living people
Players of American football from Washington, D.C.
American football defensive linemen
Oregon State Beavers football players
Seattle Seahawks players